not to be confused with Arzheim, Stadtteil of Landau
Since 1970 the village Arzheim has been incorporated into the jurisdiction of the city of Koblenz. Hence, the village of Arzheim is now being referred to as Koblenz-Arzheim. 2.200 people live in this suburb, in an area of 4,87km2.

History 
Historical documents are proof, that the first mentioning of Arzheim has been in 868 A.D. However, excavations show that settlement in this area dates back to some time in B.C.

Village Live 
Arzheim is well known in the surroundings of Koblenz for its many festivals where the whole community gathers. Most famous is the annual Kirmes (a type of fun fair involving drinking and dancing) in August and the Carnival in February.

Koblenz